Time for Heroes – The Best of The Libertines is the greatest hits collection by English rock band The Libertines, released in October 2007 on Rough Trade Records.

Overview
The album is the first material to be released by the group, who split up following a deterioration in the relationship between Pete Doherty and the other members of the band, since the single "What Became of the Likely Lads" in October 2004.

The album contains no previously unreleased material, except for the iTunes edition. However, it includes non-album singles ("What a Waster" and "Don't Look Back into the Sun") and several b-sides ("Mayday", "The Delaney" and a rerecording of "Death on the Stairs") some of which were released as bonus tracks on various editions of the band's albums. The compilation itself had zero input from the band.

Track listing
All songs written by Pete Doherty and Carl Barât except where noted.

Bonus tracks

Personnel
Mick Jones - producer (tracks: 1, 2, 5 to 7, 9, 10, 12, 13)
Bernard Butler - producer (tracks: 3, 4, 8, 11)

Chart performance

References

The Libertines albums
2007 greatest hits albums
Rough Trade Records compilation albums